Peter Lundberg is a Finnish football manager and former player, managing Finland U19 and Finland U18.

International career

International goals
Scores and results list Åland Islands' tally first.

References

External links 

Living people
Finnish footballers
Finnish expatriate footballers
Expatriate footballers in Sweden
Finnish football managers
Association football forwards
Rynninge IK players
Finnish expatriate sportspeople in Sweden
IFK Mariehamn managers
1981 births
People from Finström
Sportspeople from Åland